Gudipudi railway station (station code: GPDE), is an Indian Railways station in Gudipudi village of Guntur district in Andhra Pradesh. It lies on the Nallapadu–Pagidipalli section and is administered under Guntur railway division of South Central Railway zone. It halts 6 trains every day.

Structure and amenities 
The station has roof top solar panels installed by the Indian railways, along with various railway stations and service buildings in the country, as a part of sourcing 500 MW solar energy.

See also 
 List of railway stations in India

References

External links 

Railway stations in Guntur district
Railway stations in Guntur railway division